
Laguna Celeste is a lake of Bolivia in the Sur Lípez Province, Potosí Department. At an elevation of 4529 m, its surface area is 2.3 km².

References

Lakes of Potosí Department